Spell Capital Partners is a private equity firm based in Minnesota that specializes in the management of private equity and mezzanine capital. William Spell, the founder and President, founded the firm in 1988, and the firm is one of the oldest private equity firms in the United States. Since 2018, the firm has been investing exclusively on behalf of the Spell Family Office.

Since 1988, the firm has closed over 130 leveraged buyout (LBO) transactions.

Spell Capital historically has managed both private equity and mezzanine capital. The private equity group focuses on acquiring majority control interests in industrial manufacturing companies, while Spell Capital Mezzanine provides subordinated debt and non-control equity ownership to businesses in a variety of industries. During the summer of 2022, as part of Mr. Spell's succession planning strategy, the mezzanine group was sold to the partners and employees that managed that group.

Currently, Spell Capital has approximately $1.2 billion of assets under management (AUM), and manages ten portfolio companies owned by the Spell Family Office and four on behalf of Spell Capital Partners Fund V (a 2016 vintage fund).

Background

Spell Capital Partners LLC is a private equity firm specializing in leveraged buyouts of industrial manufacturing businesses on behalf of the Spell Family Office.

In addition to President /Founder Bill Spell, the senior members of the firm are COO/CFO, Andrea Nelson,  Senior Managing Director, Jim Rikkers, and Managing Director Harry Spell, II. Spell currently has ten employees.

The firm seeks investment opportunities globally and owns businesses in North America, Asia, Australia/New Zealand and South America. The firm has an expertise and preference for manufacturing businesses in the plastics industry, capital equipment, and niche manufacturing.

The firm invests between $5.0 million and $25.0 million in historically profitable, established businesses generating at least $5.0 million of EBITDA cash flow.

History

Bill Spell, a former investment banker, founded the company in 1988, drawing upon his prior experience as vice president and Director of Corporate Finance at a Midwest-based investment-banking firm.

Since 1988 Spell Capital has raised five equity funds and two mezzanine funds. From 1993 to 2006, the principals of Spell Capital held a controlling interest in publicly traded company, PW Eagle, which was the second largest plastic pipe manufacturer in the United States. In 2006, the company had approximately $720 million in sales with over $100 million EBITDA cash flow. During that year, Spell exited the investment.

Since 2018, the firm has been investing on behalf of the Spell Family Office.

Recognition

Spell Capital Partner's portfolio companies have received three nominations for Deal of the Year from Buyouts Magazine, one for Turnaround Deal of the Year and another for Small Market Deal of the Year. In addition, another portfolio was a finalist for the Middle Market Deal of the Year.

During 2020 Spell's mezzanine group was named SBIC Firm of the Year by the United States Small Business Administration (SBA).

Spell Capital was named to the "Top 50 PE Firms in the Middle Market" in each of the years from 2018 through 2022. In 2019, Inc Magazine included Spell Capital in its top 50 Private Equity firms.

References

Investment in the United States
Private equity firms
Companies established in 1988